Vermillion Township is one of the fifteen townships of Ashland County, Ohio, United States. The 2010 census found 2,618 people in the township, 2,170 of whom lived in the unincorporated portions of the township.

Geography
Located in the south central part of the county, it borders the following townships:
Montgomery Township - north
Perry Township - northeast corner
Mohican Township - east
Lake Township - southeast corner
Green Township - south
Monroe Township, Richland County - southwest corner
Mifflin Township - west
Milton Township - northwest corner

The village of Hayesville is located in central Vermillion Township.

Name and history
Vermillion Township was organized in 1816.

It is the only Vermillion Township statewide, although there is a Vermilion Township in Erie County.

Government
The township is governed by a three-member board of trustees, who are elected in November of odd-numbered years to a four-year term beginning on the following January 1. Two are elected in the year after the presidential election and one is elected in the year before it. There is also an elected township fiscal officer, who serves a four-year term beginning on April 1 of the year after the election, which is held in November of the year before the presidential election. Vacancies in the fiscal officership or on the board of trustees are filled by the remaining trustees.

References

External links
County website

Townships in Ashland County, Ohio
1816 establishments in Ohio
Populated places established in 1816
Townships in Ohio